David Mateos Ramajo (born 22 April 1987) is a Spanish professional footballer who plays as a defender.

Club career

Real Madrid
Born in Madrid, Mateos joined Real Madrid's youth system at the age of 12. In the 2007–08 season he made his senior debut, playing that and the following two years with the B-team in the third division.

In late January 2010, Mateos was called to the main squad by Manuel Pellegrini for a La Liga match against Deportivo de La Coruña. On 3 April of the same year, he also made the final list for the game against Racing de Santander, but failed to leave the bench on either occasion.

During the 2010–11 pre-season, Real Madrid's first-team coach, José Mourinho, said:

The coach's statements instigated Real Madrid to sign the player to a professional contract and, subsequently, Mateos was called for the first match of the season against RCD Mallorca. After the departure of Rafael van der Vaart and Royston Drenthe, to Tottenham Hotspur and Hércules CF respectively, he was promoted to the first team, being awarded the number 15 shirt previously worn by the latter.

Mateos made his official debut for Real Madrid on 23 November 2010, against AFC Ajax in the campaign's UEFA Champions League, playing ten minutes in the 4–0 away win. After the match, he said: "I will never forget this day."

On 29 January 2011, AEK Athens F.C. signed Mateos on a six-month loan contract with the option of retaining the player for an extra year. In the summer, however, he moved to Real Zaragoza on loan for one season, making his top-flight debut on 11 September in a 0–0 draw at Rayo Vallecano, but the spell was marred by injury.

In late June 2012, Mateos accepted a return to Castilla for 2012–13, after the reserves promoted to the second level after an absence of five years.

Ferencváros
On 2 September 2013, Mateos signed for Hungarian club Ferencvárosi TC. He scored two goals in 21 games in his first season, helping his team to the third position.

Orlando City
On 29 July 2015, Mateos joined Orlando City SC of the Major League Soccer, with general manager Paul McDonough describing him as a "well-versed" player who he expected to "make an impact right away". He was waived on 3 March 2017.

Real Murcia 
On 31 August 2017, Mateos signed for Real Murcia for the 2017–18 season.

Hapoel Hadera 
On the summer of 2018 Mateos mutually terminated his contract with Real Murcia to join newly promoted side Hapoel Hadera for the 2018-19 season of the Israeli Premier League.

Hapoel Ra'anana 
Mateos joined Hapoel Ra'anana, for the 2019–20 season of the Israeli Premier League.

Hapoel Umm al-Fahm 
On 14 July 2020, Mateos joined Hapoel Umm al-Fahm for the 2020–21 season of the Liga Leumit.

The Strongest 
On 5 February 2021, Mateos joined Bolivian side The Strongest for the 2021 season.

Guangxi Pingguo Haliao 
Mateos joined the newly promoted Guangxi Pingguo Haliao for the 2022 season of the China League One

Club statistics

Honours
Real Madrid
Copa del Rey: 2010–11

AEK Athens
Greek Football Cup: 2010–11

Ferencváros
Magyar Kupa: 2014–15
Ligakupa: 2014–15

References

External links

1987 births
Living people
Footballers from Madrid
Spanish footballers
Association football defenders
La Liga players
Segunda División players
Segunda División B players
Real Madrid C footballers
Real Madrid Castilla footballers
Real Madrid CF players
Real Zaragoza players
Real Murcia players
Super League Greece players
AEK Athens F.C. players
Nemzeti Bajnokság I players
Ferencvárosi TC footballers
Major League Soccer players
Orlando City SC players
Israeli Premier League players
Hapoel Hadera F.C. players
Hapoel Ra'anana A.F.C. players
Hapoel Umm al-Fahm F.C. players
The Strongest players
Spain youth international footballers
Spanish expatriate footballers
Expatriate footballers in Greece
Expatriate footballers in Hungary
Expatriate soccer players in the United States
Expatriate footballers in Israel
Expatriate footballers in Bolivia
Spanish expatriate sportspeople in Greece
Spanish expatriate sportspeople in Hungary
Spanish expatriate sportspeople in the United States
Spanish expatriate sportspeople in Israel
Spanish expatriate sportspeople in Bolivia